Canterburg is an unincorporated community in eastern Frederick County, Virginia, United States.

References

Unincorporated communities in Frederick County, Virginia
Unincorporated communities in Virginia